Fowler Creek is a stream in Boone County in the U.S. state of Missouri. It is a tributary of Cedar Creek, which in turn is a tributary of the Missouri River.

It is named after the local Fowler family.

References

Rivers of Boone County, Missouri
Rivers of Callaway County, Missouri
Rivers of Missouri